Lord Emslie may refer to:
George Emslie, Baron Emslie (1919–2002), Lord President of the Court of Session (1972–1989)
Nigel Emslie, Lord Emslie (born 1947), Senator of the College of Justice
Derek Emslie, Lord Kingarth (born 1949), Senator of the College of Justice